Dejan Zarubica (born 11 April 1993) is a Montenegrin football forward who plays for KF Laçi in  Albanian First League.

Club career
Born in Nikšić, he played in FK Sutjeska Nikšić in the 2012–13 season when they became champions of the Montenegrin First League. In January 2014 he signed with Serbian SuperLiga side OFK Beograd. In summer 2015, Zarubica returned to his hometown club Sutjeska Nikšić.

International career
In May 2016 he was part of Montenegro "B" team.

Honours
Sutjeska Nikšić
 Montenegrin First League: 2012–13
Buducnost Podgorica
 Montenegrin First League: 2020–21

References

External links
 

1993 births
Living people
Footballers from Nikšić
Association football forwards
Montenegrin footballers
Montenegro youth international footballers
FK Sutjeska Nikšić players
OFK Beograd players
FK Iskra Danilovgrad players
FK Lovćen players
FK Budućnost Podgorica players
Montenegrin First League players
Serbian SuperLiga players
Montenegrin expatriate footballers
Expatriate footballers in Serbia
Montenegrin expatriate sportspeople in Serbia